Epicrocis metallopa is a species of snout moth in the genus Epicrocis. It was described by Oswald Bertram Lower in 1898 and it is known from Australia.

The wingspan is about 20 mm. The forewings are orange with black markings.

References

Moths described in 1898
Phycitini
Endemic fauna of Australia